Parliamentary elections were held in Chile on 6 March 1921. The Radical Party received the most votes in the Chamber of Deputies elections.

Results

Chamber of Deputies

References

Elections in Chile
1921 in Chile
Chile
March 1921 events
Election and referendum articles with incomplete results